Legionella beliardensis is a Gram-negative, catalase-positive, non-spore-forming, aerobic bacterium from the genus Legionella with a single polar flagellum, which was isolated from water from heating apparatus in Montbéliard in France.

References

External links
Type strain of Legionella beliardensis at BacDive -  the Bacterial Diversity Metadatabase

Legionellales
Bacteria described in 2001